Almost Like Being in Jazz is a studio album by South-African jazz trumpeter Hugh Masekela. The album was released on  via Chisa Records label. The album consists of 12 jazz standards. The album was also released as a double LP via Straigthahead Records. In 2012, the album was followed-up with the sequel record Friends.

Track listing

Personnel
Band
Hugh Masekela – flugelhorn 
John Heard – bass 
Lorca Heart – drums
Larry Willis – piano

Production
Scott Sedillo – engineer 
Bernie Grundman – mastering
Stewart Levine – producer

References

External links

2005 albums
Hugh Masekela albums
Albums produced by Stewart Levine